Haixi may refer to:

Haixi Mongol and Tibetan Autonomous Prefecture, in Qinghai, China
Haixi Jurchens, group of the Jurchens as identified by the Chinese of the Ming Dynasty
Songhua River, formerly known as Haixi River
Roman Egypt, "West of the sea" in Chinese chronicles